The 2006–07 Scottish Football League Third Division was the 12th season in the format of ten teams in the fourth-tier of Scottish football. The season started on 4 August 2006  and ended on 28 April 2007. Berwick Rangers finished top and were promoted alongside Queen's Park as play-off winners.

East Stirlingshire finished bottom of the table for the fifth consecutive season. Despite finishing bottom again, East Stirlingshire won their battle to retain full member status of the Scottish Football League, though were warned that they would lose their status if they finished bottom in the following season.

Teams for 2006–07

Cowdenbeath as champions of the 2005–06 season were directly promoted to the 2006–07 Scottish Second Division. They were replaced by Dumbarton who finished bottom of the 2005–06 Scottish Second Division.

A second promotion place was available via a play-off tournament between the ninth-placed team of the 2005–06 Scottish Second Division, Alloa Athletic, and the sides ranked second, third and fourth in the 2005–06 Scottish Third Division, Berwick Rangers, Stenhousemuir and Arbroath respectively. The play off was won by Alloa Athletic who defeated Berwick Rangers in the final. Alloa Athletic therefore retained their Second Division status.

Overview
Relegated from Second Division to Third Division
 Dumbarton

Promoted from Third Division to Second Division
 Cowdenbeath

Stadia and attendances

Table

Results
Teams play each other four times in this league. In the first half of the season each team plays every other team twice (home and away) and then do the same in the second half of the season.

First half of season

Second half of season

Top scorers

References

Notes
 A. Stenhousemuir 5–0 Montrose (12 August 2006); East Stirlingshire 5–0 Stenhousemuir (26 August 2006); East Fife 5–0 East Stirlingshire (1 September 2006); Elgin City 5–0 East Stirlingshire (14 October 2006); Queen's Park 5–0 Montrose (20 January 2007); Queen's Park 5–0 Albion Rovers (3 March 2007).

Scottish Third Division seasons
3
4
Scot